Pekkanini (born Pekka Lunde, July 2, 1952 in Uppsala, died June 30, 2021 in Göteborg) is a Swedish composer/musician who specializes in playing the theremin.

He created the rockgroup "Ensamma Hjärtan" ("The Lonely Hearts") together with fellow musician Gunnar Danielsson in the '70s. Later they formed the duo Danielsson & Pekkanini and had some radio hits in the 1980s. Pekkanini made his first solo albums in 1982 and 1986, "Pekkanini" and "Spotlight". Since the early '80s he has composed music for more than 100 Swedish plays all around the country. As a theremin player he has made 3 solo albums, Theremin Magic (2010), Theremins in the Jukebox (2011) and Theremin tunes played in odd bars (2013). He also produced an album with songs by Sardinian composer Enrico Pasini called Songs for which he arranged and interpreted Pasini's music for the theremin. 

In 2010 he won in a category of The People's Music Awards. Pekkanini is a member of the National Academy of Recording Arts and Sciences.

References

External links

1952 births
Living people
Swedish rock musicians
Theremin players